XEFV-AM is a Regional Mexican radio station serving the border towns of Ciudad Juárez, Chihuahua, Mexico (its city of license) and El Paso, Texas, United States (where it also maintains a sales office). It is owned by MegaRadio Mexico. The station is known on-air as La Rancherita 1000 AM.

History
The first concession for XEFV was awarded in 1932 to José Onofre Meza, for a station broadcasting on 1370 kHz with 50 watts of power. Meza sold to Darío Córdoba by 1952. Upon Córdoba's death, ownership passed to his widow, Luz Esparza Vda. de Córdoba. XEFV was sold in 1994 to its current concessionaire.

External links
official website

References

Radio stations in Chihuahua
Mass media in Ciudad Juárez